1SWASP J140747.93−394542.6 (also known as 1SWASP J140747, J1407 and Mamajek's Object) is a star similar to the Sun in the constellation Centaurus at a distance of about 434 light-years from Earth. A relatively young star, its age is estimated to be 16 million years, and its mass is about 90% that of the Sun. The star has an apparent magnitude of 12.3 and requires a telescope to be seen. The star's name comes from the SuperWASP (Wide Angle Search for Planets) program and the star's coordinates. The star is variable due to the planet orbiting around it and has been given the variable star designation V1400 Centauri.

In 2007, J1407 was observed to be eclipsed and orbited by at least one major body, 1SWASP J1407b (J1407b), thought to be either a large gas giant planet or a brown dwarf, with an immense ring system. Subsequent observations have not successfully detected J1407b, suggesting that it is on a highly eccentric orbit around the star.

By 2021, it was discovered the parent star is strongly variable, with a 5.4-year long magnetic activity cycle, and no evidence was detected of additional planets or a repeat of the deep eclipses attributed to a transiting ring system.

Suspected planetary system

The discovery of the J1407 system and its unusual eclipses were first reported by a team led by University of Rochester astronomer Eric Mamajek in 2012. The existence and parameters of the ring system around the substellar companion J1407b were deduced from the observation of a very long and complex eclipse of the parent star lasting 56 days during April and May 2007. The low-mass companion J1407b has been referred to as "Super Saturn" due to its massive system of circumplanetary rings with a radius of approximately 90 million km (0.6 AU). The orbital period of J1407b is estimated to be around a decade (3.5 to 13.8 years), and its most probable mass is approximately 13 to 26 Jupiter masses, but with considerable uncertainty. The ringed body can be ruled out as being a star with mass of over 80 Jupiter masses at greater than 99% confidence. The ring system has an estimated mass similar to that of the Earth. A major gap in the rings at about 61 million km (0.4 AU) from its centre is considered to be indirect evidence of the existence of an exomoon with mass up to 0.8 Earth masses.

J1407b is the first exoplanet or brown dwarf discovered with a ring system by the transit method. A sequence of occultations (eclipses) of the star occurred over a 56-day period in 2007. The pattern was consistent with that expected for the transit of a large array of multiple rings, indicating the substellar companion dubbed "J1407b". The J1407b ring system has an outer radius of approximately 90 million km (about 640 times the extent of Saturn's rings). Cleared gaps in the rings indicate satellites ("exomoons") have accreted from denser rings.  The young age of the stellar system (about 16 million years) and the high mass of the ring system (roughly an Earth mass) are more consistent with it being an early (proto-)exomoon or moons, rather than a long-term stable ring system in an evolved planetary system (such as Saturn's rings).

J1407b has not been observed since its transit in 2007, suggesting that it is on a highly eccentric orbit around the star. Such an orbit could disrupt the ring system of J1407b. Dynamical simulations run by astronomers Steven Rieder and Matthew Kenworthy indicate that in order for J1407b's ring system to be stable, the rings must orbit J1407b in a retrograde motion, opposite to the direction J1407b orbits its host star. This retrograde solution for the ring system of J1407b allows for longer ring lifetimes as well as further constraints to the age of the ring system. The rings may be replenished over timescales as a result of processes that produce additional debris around J1407b, such as the tidal disruption of comets.

J1407b may also not be bound to J1407. No other deep eclipses has been found in the data spanning from 1890 to 1990, nor in recent time-series photometry from 2012-2018. A significant proportion of orbital periods for J1407b from 5 to 20 years can be disregarded, with the actual orbital period being likely outside of this range.

An explanation involving J1407b orbiting J1407 would have J1407b as a brown dwarf companion with a large, Hill sphere filling ring system. However, issues with the stability of any rings combined with the lack of detection of another eclipse, suggests that J1407b may not be bound to J1407. 

From Earth's point of view, the ring system of J1407b would have an angular diameter of about 3.7 milliarcseconds across. For comparison, if Saturn were as many light years away, its rings in full breadth would be 0.006 milliarcseconds across, and the diameter of Pluto from earth varies between 60 and 110 milliarcseconds across.

No additional transits from Jupiter-sized or larger planets were discovered in a 19-year long observational series by 2021.

See also
 List of stars that have unusual dimming periods

Notes
1.J1407b ring system diameter = 0.0000190 ly; distance = ~439 ly. 0.0000190/439=0.000000043 of the sky; 0.00000104 degrees; 0.000062 arcminutes; 0.00374 arcseconds; 3.74 milliarcseconds Saturn's main ring system diameter (D-F rings) = 0.0000000296 ly; distance = 439 ly. 0.0000000296/439=0.0000000000674 of the sky; 0.00000000162 degrees; 0.000000097 arcminutes; 0.00000583 arcseconds; 0.00583 milliarcseconds

References

External links
  Extrasolar Planet Encyclopedia page on J1407b, (Accessed January 29, 2015)
 Exoring model for J1407b, on Vimeo.
 'Saturn on Steroids': 1st Ringed Planet Beyond Solar System Possibly Found
 Eric Mamajek's webpage at University of Rochester

Centaurus (constellation)
Hypothetical planetary systems
Planetary rings
Exoplanets discovered in 2012
K-type subgiants
Variable stars
Centauri, V1400